John Kennedy (fl. 1987) is an American conductor and composer, presently serving as Resident Conductor and Director of Orchestral Activities of Spoleto Festival USA in Charleston, South Carolina.

Biography 

Originally a percussionist who was trained at the Oberlin Conservatory and Northwestern University, Kennedy lived in New York City from 1984 to 1999. Kennedy co-founded and led the new music ensemble Essential Music, a group of flexible instrumentation which from 1987 to 2001 led a broad traversal of the American Experimental Tradition and presented over 100 concerts. During this period Kennedy had an association with John Cage, reviving a number of Cage's early works, including restoring the radio play The City Wears a Slouch Hat. Kennedy also led the rediscoveries of the music of Johanna M. Beyer and William Russell in performances and recordings by Essential Music.

Kennedy lived in Santa Fe from 1999 to 2012, where he founded Santa Fe New Music. From 2002-2005, he served as artist President/Chair of the American Music Center.

Kennedy has had a long association with Spoleto Festival USA, leading the contemporary music component since 1990 and over time, assuming a wider role in the orchestra and opera programs. Since 2010, he has been the festival's chief conductor and led American premieres of operas by Pascal Dusapin, Philip Glass, Wolfgang Rihm, Kaija Saariaho, Toshio Hosokawa, and others.

Kennedy has written and spoken widely on contemporary music and advocated audience development through its relevance and accessibility to general audiences. His work at Spoleto and in Santa Fe has been noted for great audience loyalty.

As a composer, Kennedy's works have been performed worldwide, including at San Francisco's Other Minds Festival, Paris Festival d’Automne, Aspekte Salzburg, the Zurich June Festival, London’s Wigmore Hall Piano Fest, the Singapore Arts Festival, and the Kanagawa Arts Festival. He has been commissioned by many organizations including the Santa Fe Opera and the Sarasota Opera.

Kennedy is a Lecturer in the Department of Music at Santa Clara University in Santa Clara, California, and makes his home in the East Bay, Northern California.

Select Works 
Chant (1998) for three percussion

Collective Sentiments (1998) for variable instrumentation

Fanfare for the Common Gun (1994) for the Brady Bill for handguns

Nostalgic Patterns (1995) for variable instrumentation

Animals in Distress (1995) for animal distress calls

Exigencies of Inner Rhythm (1998) for four percussion

One Body (1998) chamber cantata for countertenor/baritone, string quartet, two percussion

Someday (2000) for a cappella choir

Guadalupe (2000) musicdrama for soprano, chorus, small orchestra

The Language of Birds (2004) opera with libretto by Peter M. Krask

Storm and Stress (2005) for orchestra

First Deconstruction (in plastic) (2006) for two percussion

Recession and Procession (2006) for brass quintet

Trinity (2007) chamber opera with libretto by Andrea Fellows Walters

Horn Concerto (2007) solo horn with large orchestra

BAGHDAD (2007) variations on B-A-G-H-D-A-D for string orchestra

Garden Winds (2011) for chamber orchestra

Island in Time (2012) for chamber ensemble

iPhone 4tet (2012) for four smartphones

Discography 
Chant on Ten Years of Essential Music (1998)

One Body (2000)

Someday (2007)

Naturali Periclitati (2009)

Even the Stones Breathe (2013)

External links
Official Website: 

American male composers
21st-century American composers
American male conductors (music)
Living people
Oberlin Conservatory of Music alumni
Place of birth missing (living people)
Northwestern University alumni
21st-century American conductors (music)
21st-century American male musicians
Year of birth missing (living people)